Mustoja Landscape Conservation Area is a nature park is located in Võru County, Estonia.

The area of the nature park is 3488 ha.

The protected area was founded in 1998 to protect rare landforms and forest ecosystems near Mustoja River.

References

Nature reserves in Estonia
Geography of Võru County